The fifth Central American and Caribbean Games were held in Barranquilla, Colombia, from 5 March to 25 March 1946. These games featured 1,540 athletes from thirteen nations, competing in seventeen sports.

Sports

Medal table

References
 Meta
 

 
Central American and Caribbean Games
Central American and Caribbean Games, 1935
Central
Central American And Caribbean Games, 1946
1946 in Caribbean sport
1946 in Central American sport
Multi-sport events in Colombia
Sport in Barranquilla
March 1946 sports events in South America